Clay Center Municipal Airport  is a city-owned, public-use airport two miles west of Clay Center, in Clay County, Kansas, United States. It opened on August 8, 1930. 

Although most U.S. airports use the same three-letter location identifier for the FAA and IATA, Clay Center Municipal Airport is assigned CYW by the FAA but has no designation from the IATA.

Facilities and aircraft
For the 12-month period ending September 26, 2016, the airport had 31,000 aircraft operations, average 85 per day: 71% general aviation and 29% military. 15 single-engine aircraft were then based at the airport.

References

External links

Airports in Kansas
Buildings and structures in Clay County, Kansas